Javier de la Plaza (born 22 October 1973) is a Spanish sailor. He competed in the 49er event at the 2000 Summer Olympics.

References

External links
 

1973 births
Living people
Spanish male sailors (sport)
Olympic sailors of Spain
Sailors at the 2000 Summer Olympics – 49er
Sportspeople from Santander, Spain
Sailors (sport) from Cantabria